Honor Society is a 2022 American coming-of-age comedy film starring Angourie Rice and Gaten Matarazzo. It is directed by Oran Zegman based on a screenplay written by David A. Goodman.

It was released on Paramount+ on July 29, 2022, to positive reviews from critics, with praise for the performances of Rice, Matarazzo, and Mintz-Plasse.

Plot 
Honor Rose is an ambitious senior at George H. W. Bush High School who has dedicated her entire academic career to being accepted into Harvard University, hoping to escape her mediocre middle-class life. Part of this plan (which also includes feigning several interests) involves earning a letter of recommendation from her guidance counselor, Mr. Calvin. Calvin, a wannabe musician with an inappropriate crush on Honor, has connections to the university and tells her that he is considering her plus three other students for the recommendation. She quickly deduces who they are: star athlete Travis Biggins, creative introvert Kennedy Park, and the awkward but academically brilliant nerd Michael Dipnicky. Honor resolves to eliminate all of them from contention with the help from "fake" friends Emma and Talia.

Honor's master plan begins when she joins the theatre club and persuades them to put on a production of Mary I of England, hoping the project will distract Kennedy and cause her grades to sink. Honor also persuades Travis to join the production, hoping to sabotage his athletic prestige and push him into pursuing his closeted crush on one of the actors. Believing that Michael is interested in her and bad at talking to girls, Honor makes herself his lab partner and accepts his requests to follow her on social media. In her attempts to charm him, Honor invites Michael to her house for study sessions.

During their first study session, Honor tries to distract Michael by dressing scantily and insincerely flirting with him, but Michael ends up charming her instead with his kindness and their mutual interest in The Handmaid's Tale. Honor eventually proposes studying at Michael's house next time, but he is hesitant. She soon discovers that this is because Michael lives in foster care. Her increasing attraction to Michael is fully realized when they sneak into a fancy house after school. Michael kisses her, and they start a relationship which culminates in Honor publicly kissing him, shocking her classmates. Meanwhile, she begins to genuinely enjoy the theatre club and making real bonds with Kennedy and Travis. Calvin also starts to make stronger sexual advances to Honor, even going as far to sexually proposition her for the Harvard recommendation, an offer she refuses.

Honor eventually decides to let Michael have the recommendation, as she finds herself both feeling sorry for him and happy with her new circle of friends. One day, Michael texts her during lunch, saying he is alone at home. Honor goes to Michael's foster home and discovers he does not live there, but at the fancy house which they had "snuck into" earlier. She discovers that Michael is not only very well off, but just as manipulative as she is. Michael reveals that he duped Honor the entire time from when they first started talking, planning to get her to fall in love with him so she would concede the Harvard recommendation for him. A shocked and heartbroken Honor breaks up with Michael and leaves.

Kennedy's production is finally put on to huge success, and Honor finds herself as a genuine friend to the whole club, having helped Kennedy come out of her shell and Travis to publicly come out. Deciding to make one last move in the race for the recommendation, she soon goes to Calvin's office just as Michael is about to receive it. Playing a recording of one of Calvin's more aggressive advances, Honor blackmails him into giving the recommendation to Kennedy over Michael. Honor then decides to enjoy the rest of her senior year, unsure of her likely still-bright academic future but happy with her new friends and newly appreciative of her life as a whole.

Cast 
 Angourie Rice as Honor Rose
 Gaten Matarazzo as Michael Dipnicky
 Christopher Mintz-Plasse as Mr. Calvin
 Armani Jackson as Travis Biggins
 Amy Keum as Kennedy Park 
 Ben Jackson Walker as Gary
 Kelcey Mawema as Talia
 Avery Konrad as Emma
 Micheal P. Northey as Marvin Rose
 Kerry Butler as Janet Rose
 Andres Collantes as Diesel
 Danny Wattley as Coach Biggins
 Candice Hunter as Ms. Felson
 Arghavan Jenati as Lily Chugani
 Miku Martineau as Christine
 Jason Sakaki as Brad
 Zoë Christie as Grace
 Matreya Monro as Ms. Dipnicky

Production 
In January 2022, the film was greenlit, with production taking place in Vancouver.

Reception

Viewership 
Over its first week of release, Honor Society was the most-watched title on Paramount+.

Critical response 
 On Metacritic, the film has a weighted average score of 66 out of 100, based on six critics, indicating "generally favorable reviews".

Glenn Kenny of The New York Times wrote, "[Honor Society] comes out of the gate flashing a formal and thematic sophistication so dazzling it might take you a while to realize it’s actually a Young Adult movie." John Anderson of The Wall Street Journal wrote, "Reassuringly -- and very entertainingly -- Ms. Rice makes all of Honor’s plotting palatable, even charming, and her jaded worldview is not totally unreasonable." Tomris Laffly of Variety called it, "A surprisingly compelling high school caper conceived with youthful wit, aplomb and a genuinely out-of-left-field  twist." Martin Carr of We Got This Covered  wrote, Honor Society is a feel good film plucked straight from the John Hughes era, by way of genre staples 'Clueless' and 'Mean Girls', with Angourie Rice and Gaten Mattarazzo standing out alongside Christopher Mintz-Plasse on scene stealing form."

References

External links 
 

2022 comedy films
2022 directorial debut films
2020s American films
2020s coming-of-age comedy films
2020s English-language films
2020s high school films
American coming-of-age comedy films
American high school films
Films shot in Vancouver
Paramount+ original films